B01 may refer to:

 ATC code B01 Antithrombotic agents, a subgroup of the Anatomical Therapeutic Chemical Classification System
 Center Counter Defense, an Encyclopaedia of Chess Openings designation